Love & War is the debut studio album by Australian recording artist Daniel Merriweather, the album was released on 1 June 2009, on Marlin Records/Universal (AUS), Allido/Columbia/RCA (UK). The success of singles "Change" and "Red", both of which cracked the UK top ten was enough to propel the album to number two on the UK Albums Chart. The album was released on 23 February 2010 in the United States under J Records and Allido Records. It features string arrangements by David Campbell.

Singles 
 "Change" was released in February 2009. It featured rapper Wale and reached number eight on the UK Singles Chart, marking his second top ten single placing.
 "Red" was released in May 2009. "Red" entered the UK singles chart at number five, making it his second UK top ten single and first entry into the top five as a lead performer.
 "Impossible" was released on 17 August 2009, and peaked at a low #67 on the UK Singles Chart.
 "Water and a Flame" was the fourth and final single released on 2 November 2009, and peaked at #180 on the UK Singles Chart.

Reception
Love & War has generally received positive reviews. At Metacritic, which assigns a normalized rating out of 100 to reviews from mainstream critics, the album has received a score of 66, based on five reviews.

Track listing
 "For Your Money" – 4:53
 "Impossible" – 4:07
 "Change" (featuring Wale) – 3:21
 "Chainsaw" – 4:05
 "Cigarettes" – 3:24 (co-written by singer Jordan Galland)
 "Red" – 3:53
 "Could You" – 3:36
 "Not Giving Up" – 3:14
 "Getting Out" – 3:17
 "Water and a Flame" (featuring Adele) – 3:40
 "Live by Night" – 2:53 (co written by Jordan Galland)
 "Giving Everything Away for Free" – 3:30
 "The Children" (Digital/US/Japan Bonus Track) – 3:29
 "You Don't Know What Love Is" originally by The White Stripes (US Digital/Japan Bonus Track) – 4:13
 "I Think I'm in Love" (US Digital Bonus Track)
 "Cigarettes" (US iTunes Pre-order Bonus Track)

Charts and sales
The album debuted at #2 on the UK Albums Chart selling 43,000 copies in its first week and was the third highest first week sales for a debut album in 2009 at the time. The album was certified Platinum in the United Kingdom after selling 300,000 copies.

Certifications

References

2009 albums
Daniel Merriweather albums
Albums produced by Mark Ronson
ARIA Award-winning albums